Gente (complete name: Gente y la actualidad) is an Argentine magazine. It is considered one of the most important gossip magazines in the country. Its concept and design was influenced by the Italian magazine Gente.

It has received criticism for supporting the National Reorganization Process (1976–1983).

References

External links

1965 establishments in Argentina
News magazines published in Argentina
Celebrity magazines
Magazines established in 1965
Magazines published in Buenos Aires
Spanish-language magazines
Weekly news magazines